EMKA Limited is a division of Universal Television with the sole function of overseeing the 1929–1949 Paramount Pictures sound feature film library.

History 
A few years after the ruling of the United States v. Paramount Pictures, Inc. case in 1948, Music Corporation of America (MCA) approached Paramount offering $50 million for 750 sound feature films released prior to December 1, 1949 with payment to be spread over a period of several years. Paramount saw this as a bargain since the studio saw very little value in its library of old films at the time. To address any antitrust concerns, MCA set up EMKA, Ltd. as a dummy corporation to sell these films to television. EMKA's Paramount library includes the first seven Marx Brothers films (although it took until 1974 for rights issues to be cleared for Animal Crackers before it could legally be shown again), the first five Bob Hope–Bing Crosby Road to... pictures, and other classics such as Trouble in Paradise, Shanghai Express, She Done Him Wrong, Sullivan's Travels, The Palm Beach Story, For Whom The Bell Tolls, Double Indemnity, Going My Way, The Lost Weekend and The Heiress.

Over the years, MCA took in more than a billion dollars in rentals of these supposedly "worthless" films. In 1962, MCA purchased the US branch of Decca Records, then the parent company of Universal Studios. MCA eventually was renamed as Universal Studios in 1996 which was sold to Vivendi in 2000. In 1997, Universal Television was sold to USA Networks, 5 years later on May 28, 2002, its entertainment assets were sold to Vivendi Universal. In 2004, Vivendi, merged its entertainment division with General Electric's NBC to form NBC Universal. In 2011, Comcast bought 51% of NBC Universal from Vivendi and renamed it NBCUniversal, and in 2013, Comcast bought remaining 49% of NBCUniversal from GE.

Current status 
EMKA continues to exist as a division of Universal Television with Universal holding theatrical and home video distribution rights, while NBCUniversal Syndication Studios holding television distribution rights. Some of EMKA's films were remade by Universal in later years such as Meet Joe Black, a remake of Death Takes a Holiday, and a few other films became adapted by Revue Studios as television series.

External links 
 Universal Studios
 Universal Pictures

NBCUniversal
Film distributors of the United States
Universal Pictures